José Antonio Michelena (born September 1, 1988 in Río Chico (Río Negro), Argentina) is an Argentine footballer currently playing for Deportivo Madryn in the Torneo Argentino A, the 3rd level of Argentine football league system.

Teams
  Cruz del Sur 2006-2008
  9 de Julio (M) 2008-2009
  Cruz del Sur 2009
  Huracán de Tres Arroyos 2010-2011
  Racing de Olavarría 2011
  Real Potosí 2012
  Huracán de Tres Arroyos 2012-2013
  Deportivo Madryn 2014-2017
  Juventud Unida Universitario 2018-2019
  Deportivo Madryn 2019-

References
 
 

1988 births
Living people
People from Río Negro Province
Argentine footballers
Argentine expatriate footballers
Huracán de Tres Arroyos footballers
Club Real Potosí players
Expatriate footballers in Bolivia
Association footballers not categorized by position